Kim Clijsters and Ai Sugiyama were the defending champions, however Clijsters did not compete.

Cara Black and Rennae Stubbs defeated Sugiyama and Liezel Huber in the final, 6–3, 7–6(7–5) to win the ladies' doubles tennis title at the 2004 Wimbledon Championships.

Virginia Ruano Pascual and Paola Suárez had the chance to hold all four Grand Slam championship titles, but lost to Black and Stubbs in the semifinals, also snapping a streak of nine straight Grand Slam finals reached by Ruano Pascual and Suárez.

Seeds

  Virginia Ruano Pascual /  Paola Suárez (semifinals)
  Svetlana Kuznetsova /  Elena Likhovtseva (quarterfinals)
  Martina Navratilova /  Lisa Raymond (semifinals)
  Nadia Petrova /  Meghann Shaughnessy (quarterfinals)
  Liezel Huber /  Ai Sugiyama (final)
  Cara Black /  Rennae Stubbs (champions)
  Janette Husárová /  Conchita Martínez (third round)
  María Vento-Kabchi /  Angelique Widjaja (quarterfinals)
  Myriam Casanova /  Nicole Pratt (second round)
 n/a
  Marion Bartoli  /  Émilie Loit (quarterfinals)
  Li Ting /  Sun Tiantian (first round)
  Anastasia Myskina /  Vera Zvonareva (second round, withdrew)
  Silvia Farina Elia /  Francesca Schiavone (second round, withdrew)
  Els Callens /  Petra Mandula (third round)
  Emmanuelle Gagliardi /  Roberta Vinci (third round)
  Alicia Molik /  Magüi Serna (second round)

Qualifying

Draw

Finals

Top half

Section 1

Section 2

Bottom half

Section 3

Section 4

References

External links

2004 Wimbledon Championships on WTAtennis.com
2004 Wimbledon Championships – Women's draws and results at the International Tennis Federation

Women's Doubles
Wimbledon Championship by year – Women's doubles
Wimbledon Championships
Wimbledon Championships